John Keith Russell (born January 15, 1948) is an American former diver who competed in the 1968 Summer Olympics.

References

1948 births
Living people
Olympic divers of the United States
Divers at the 1968 Summer Olympics
Pan American Games medalists in diving
Pan American Games silver medalists for the United States
Universiade medalists in diving
Divers at the 1967 Pan American Games
Universiade gold medalists for the United States
Universiade silver medalists for the United States
Medalists at the 1967 Summer Universiade
Medalists at the 1967 Pan American Games